Morone is a surname, and may refer to:

 Domenico Morone ( 1442–1518), Italian painter
 Francesco Morone, Italian painter
 Franco Morone, Italian guitar player, teacher, composer and arranger
 Giovanni Morone, Italian cardinal
 James Morone, American political scientist and author